USS O-8 (SS-69) was one of 16 O-class submarines built for the United States Navy during World War I.

Description
The O-class submarines were designed to meet a Navy requirement for coastal defense boats. They displaced  on the surface and  submerged. The O-class submarines had a crew of 29 officers and enlisted men.

For surface running, the boats were powered by two  diesel engines, each driving one propeller shaft. When submerged each propeller was driven by a  electric motor. They could reach  on the surface and  underwater.

The boats were armed with four 18-inch (450 mm)  torpedo tubes in the bow. They carried four reloads, for a total of eight torpedoes. The O-class submarines were also armed with a single 3"/50 caliber deck gun.

Construction and career
O-8 was laid down on 27 February 1917 by Fore River Shipbuilding Company in Quincy, Massachusetts. She was launched on 31 December 1917 sponsored by Mrs. Alice C. Burg, and commissioned on 11 July 1918. During the final stages of World War I, O-8 operated out of Philadelphia, Pennsylvania, on coastal patrol duty from Cape Cod to Key West, Florida. She departed Newport, Rhode Island, on 2 November 1918 with other subs ordered to duty in European waters; the duty was cancelled, however, as the Armistice with Germany was signed before the vessels reached the Azores.

The end of the "war to end all wars" did not terminate O-8s career; she now operated in a training capacity at the Submarine School, New London, Connecticut. In 1924, she sailed for duty in Panama, where she was classified a second line submarine on 25 July 1924. Reverting to a first liner on 6 June 1928, she sailed from New London in February 1931 to Philadelphia and decommissioned there 27 May.

The imminence of World War II sparked the recall to service. O-8 recommissioned at Philadelphia on 28 April 1941, with Lt. John S. McCain, Jr. taking command. In June she returned to Submarine School, New London to train students there until war's end.

Departing New London on 25 August 1945, the ship steamed to Portsmouth, New Hampshire, and decommissioned there on 11 September 1945; she was struck from the Naval Vessel Register on 11 October 1945 and was sold to John J. Duane Company of Quincy on 4 September 1946.

Notes

References

External links
 
 Beautiful, sharp black and white pictures taken of the interior and exterior of USS O-8 (SS-69)

United States O-class submarines
World War I submarines of the United States
World War II submarines of the United States
Ships built in Quincy, Massachusetts
1917 ships